That's Greek to me or it's (all) Greek to me is an idiom in English referring to an expression that is difficult to understand for the sayer. It is commonly a complex or imprecise verbal or written expression or diagram, often containing excessive use of jargon, dialect, mathematics, science, or symbols.

Although to some it may seem an insult, the metaphor simply refers to the Greek language (either ancient or modern) as typifying foreign communication, written or spoken, and may be a dead metaphor, one that has lost its original understood meaning.

Origins
The phrase is widely believed to have its origins among medieval scribes. While most scribes were familiar with Latin, few people in medieval Western Europe, even among the intellectual classes, were schooled in Greek. When copying classic manuscripts they would frequently encounter passages and quotations in Greek which they would have no way of translating, and as such would note the phrase in the margins.

Recorded usage of the metaphor in English traces back to the early modern period. It appears in 1599 in Shakespeare's play Julius Caesar, as spoken by Servilius Casca to Cassius after a festival in which Caesar was offered a crown:

Here, Casca's literal ignorance of Greek is the source of the phrase, using its common meaning to play on the uncertainty among the conspirators about Cicero's attitude to Caesar's increasingly regal behaviour.

Shakespeare was not the only author to use the expression. It was also used in 1603 by Thomas Dekker in his play Patient Grissel:

The expression is almost exclusively used with reference to the speaker (generally "Greek to me"); Dekker's "Greek to him" is rare.

Variations
Different languages have similar formulations. Many have picked the point of reference to be a foreign language with another alphabet or writing system.

This is an example of the usage of demonyms in relation to the ability of a people to be understood, comparable to the development of the words barbarian (one who babbles), Nemec (Slavic for "the mute one," indicating Germans).

In other languages
In an article published by Arnold L. Rosenberg in the language journal Lingvisticæ Investigationes, he claimed that there was a popular "consensus" that Chinese was the "hardest" language, since various non-English languages most frequently used the Chinese language in their equivalent expression to the English idiom "it's all Greek to me". Also, David Moser of the University of Michigan Center for Chinese Studies made the same claim as Arnold L. Rosenberg.

See also
 Greeking
 Writing system

References

External links 

 Omniglot: "Translations of It's all Greek/Chinese/Hebrew/Arabic to me in many languages".
 Translations of "it's all Greek to me" on Wordreference.com

English phrases
Greek language
Metaphors
16th-century neologisms